The 2017 South American U-15 Championship was an international football tournament held in Argentina from 5 to 19 November 2017. The twelve national teams involved in the tournament (all 10 CONMEBOL member national teams and 2 invited UEFA teams) were required to register a squad of 22 players, three of whom must have been goalkeepers. Only players in these squads were eligible to take part in the tournament.

Each national team had to submit its list of 22 players to CONMEBOL by 24 October 2017 deadline. National teams were able to change up to five players in their squad up to five days before the start of the tournament, in that case, the final list had to be submitted to CONMEBOL by 31 October 2017. After that date, teams could only make late replacements in the event of serious injury, up to 24 hours prior to the start of the tournament.
 
All registered players had to have been born on or after 1 January 2002. The age listed for each player is on 5 November 2017, the first day of the tournament.

On 5 November 2017, CONMEBOL published the lists of the twelve teams.

Group A

Argentina
Head coach: Diego Placente

The 22-man squad was announced on 28 October 2017.

Czech Republic
Head coach: Antonín Barák

The 22-man squad was announced on 24 October 2017. Midfielder Jakub Drozd was replaced by Martin Kudela-

Uruguay
Head coach: Diego Demarco

The 22-man squad was announced on 22 October 2017.

Colombia
Head coach: Jorge Serna

The 22-man squad was announced on 5 November 2017.

Paraguay
Head coach: Gerardo González

The 22-man squad was announced on 1 November 2017.

Chile
Head coach: Cristian Leiva

The 23-man squad was announced on 4 November 2017.

Group B

Brazil
Head coach: Paulo Victor Gomes

The 22-man squad was announced on 27 October 2017.

Croatia
Head coach: Mladen Ivančić

The 20-man squad was announced on 24 October 2017.

Ecuador
Head coach: Luigi Pescarolo

The 22-man squad was announced on 30 October 2017.

Bolivia
Head coach: Alberto Illanes

The 22-man squad was announced on 2 November 2017.

Peru
Head coach: Edgar Teixeira

The 22-man squad was announced on 2 November 2017. Defender Leandro Chiri was replaced by Renzo Zubiate.

Venezuela
Head coach: Frank Tamanaco

The 22-man squad was announced on 2 November 2017.

References

2017